Mtonia is a monotypic genus of flowering plants belonging to the family Asteraceae. The only species is Mtonia glandulifera.

The species is found in Tanzania.

References

Astereae
Monotypic Asteraceae genera